The following list is a discography of production by Travis Scott, an American rapper, singer, and hip hop record producer. It includes a list of songs produced, co-produced and remixed by year, artist, album and title.

Singles produced

2012

Julian Stephen – The University of Julian 2
13. "Circles" (featuring Jay Wrecka)

Ro Ransom – Ransomnia
08. "Many Names, One Heart"

Various artists – Kanye West Presents GOOD Music: Cruel Summer
01. "To the World" (performed by Kanye West, R. Kelly and Teyana Taylor) (additional production)
05. "The Morning" (performed by Raekwon, Pusha T, Common, 2 Chainz, Cyhi the Prynce, Kid Cudi, D'banj and Kanye West) (co-production)
08. "Sin City" (performed by John Legend, Scott, Teyana Taylor, Cyhi the Prynce and Malik Yusef)

2013

Various artists – DJ Drama Presents: XXL 2013's Freshmen Class
07. "God Level" (performed by Travis Scott)

Hustle Gang – G.D.O.D. (Get Dough or Die)
 17. "Animal" (featuring Travis Scott, B.o.B & T.I.)

Travis Scott – Owl Pharaoh
01. "Meadow Creek"
02. "Bad Mood/Shit on You" (produced with Emile)
05. "Uptown" (featuring A$AP Ferg) (produced with WondaGurl)
06. "Hell of A Night" (produced with DJ Dahi, Rey Reel & Rahki)
07. "Blocka La Flame" (produced with Young Chop & Mike Dean)
08. "Naked" (produced with J Gramm)
10. "MIA" (produced with Lex Luger)
11. "Drive" (featuring James Fauntleroy)
12. "Quintana" (featuring Wale)
13. "Bandz" (featuring Meek Mill)

Kanye West – Yeezus
03. "I Am A God" (additional programming)
04. "New Slaves" (additional production)
08. "Guilt Trip" (featuring Kid Cudi) (additional production)

Wale – The Gifted
12. "Rotation" (featuring Wiz Khalifa & 2 Chainz)

Jay-Z – Magna Carta Holy Grail
08. "Crown" (additional vocals)

Trinidad James – 10 PC Mild
01. "WutEL$e"
03. "$hut Up!!!"(Add. Vocals)

Big Sean – Hall of Fame
03. "10 2 10" (additional production)

John Legend – Love in the Future
18. "We Loved It" (featuring Seal) (additional production)

2014

Big Sean 
"1st Quarter Freestyle" (produced with Key Wane)

Travis Scott – Days Before Rodeo
01. "Days Before Rodeo: The Prayer" (produced with WondaGurl)
02. "Mamacita" (featuring Young Thug & Rich Homie Quan)(production DJ Dahi & Metro Boomin) 
05. "Don't Play" (featuring The 1975 & Big Sean) (production Vinylz, Allen Ritter, & Kanye West)
06. "Skyfall" (featuring Young Thug) (produced with Metro Boomin)
07. "Zombies"  (produced with Lex Luger & Hector)
08. "Sloppy Toppy" (featuring Migos and Peewee Longway) (produced with FKi)
09. "Basement Freestyle"  (produced with Lex Luger & Metro Boomin)
10. "Backyard"  (produced with OZ & Syk Sense)
12. "BACC"  (produced with Metro Boomin)

2015

Drake – If You're Reading This It's Too Late
14. "Company" (featuring Travis Scott) (produced with Southside, TM88, Allen Ritter & WondaGurl)

Madonna – Rebel Heart
05. "Illuminati" (produced with Madonna, Kanye West, Mike Dean & Charlie Heat)

Travis Scott – Rodeo 
08. "Piss on Your Grave" (featuring Kanye West) (produced with Kanye West & Wals Escobar)
14. "Apple Pie" (produced with Mike Dean, Terrace Martin & 1500 or Nothin')

Rihanna - Non-album single 
00. "Bitch Better Have My Money" (additional production)

2016

Rihanna - Anti 
06. "Woo" (produced with Hit-Boy & Kuk Harrell)
15. "Pose" (produced with Hit-Boy & Kuk Harrell)

2018

Migos - Culture 2 
12. "White Sand" (additional production)

London Jae - Gunz & Roses 
 07. "Vodka" (featuring Travis Scott)

Quavo - Quavo Huncho 
19. "Lost" (Produced with Joseph DaVinci, Mike Almighty, Kid Cudi, Quavo)

2020

Don Toliver - Heaven or Hell 
04. "After Party" (additional production)
07. "Candy" (additional production)

References

External links
 
 
 

Production discographies
Hip hop discographies
Discographies of American artists